Cholpon (Kyrgyz: Чолпон, Çolpon) means morning star (Venus) in Kyrgyz language and may refer to:

Localities in Kyrgyzstan
Cholpon-Ata, a resort town 
Cholpon-Ata Airport
Cholpon, Issyk-Kul, a village
Cholpon, Naryn, a village

People with the given name
Cholpon Orozobekova (born 1975), Kyrgyz journalist
Cholpon Sultanbekova (born 1969), Kyrgyz politician
Choʻlpon (1893–1938), Uzbek poet, playwright, novelist and translator

See also
Chulpan (disambiguation), a Tatar-language version of Cholpon